"Runnin' Away with My Heart" is a song recorded by American country music band Lonestar. It was released in May 1996 as the third single and fourth track from their self-titled debut album.  It peaked at No. 8 on the country charts in the United States, and at No. 9 in Canada. Michael Britt, the band's guitarist, co-wrote the song with Mark D. Sanders and Sam Hogin.

Chart positions
"Runnin' Away with My Heart" debuted at number 73 on the U.S. Billboard Hot Country Singles & Tracks for the week of May 25, 1996.

Year-end charts

References

1996 singles
1995 songs
Lonestar songs
Songs written by Mark D. Sanders
Song recordings produced by Don Cook
BNA Records singles
Songs written by Sam Hogin